The Socialist League was a Trotskyist organisation in Finland. It was affiliated to the International Socialist Tendency. From 1995 until 1998 the organisation was known as Communist Youth (Kommunistinuoret).

At its founding the Communist Youth was close to the "new" Communist Party of Finland (SKP) but supporters of the SKP left the organisation after the name change. They founded Communist Youth League of Finland in 2000.

The Socialist League published the magazines Murros and Antikapitalisti. The organisation was active in different left led protests.

See also

External links 
Sosialistiliitto (Finnish)
Murros -lehti (Finnish, the Murros magazine)

Communist parties in Finland